Shiladitya Dev is an Indian politician. He is a member of Bharatiya Janata Party. He was elected in Assam Legislative Assembly election in 2016 from Hojai constituency.

On 3 April, the Assam BJP issued a show cause notice to Dev after he defied the party by forming the Hojai Municipal Board with the help of MLAs from the All India United Democratic Front, the Indian National Congress, and other independents.

Controversy
Shiladitya from India's ruling Bharatiya Janata Party’s Assam unit termed the creation of Bangladesh a "great mistake".

Because, he argued, Assam has been facing "Muslim influx" for decades, Indian daily The Times of India reported on Tuesday. The controversial comment came at a time when there are tensions in Indian state of Assam over citizenship of Indian Muslims.

The ToI report, titled “India should have annexed Bangladesh: Assam BJP MLA”, said the legislator made the comment while speaking to a local news channel in Nagaon in Assam on 2018.

References 

Living people
Bharatiya Janata Party politicians from Assam
Assam MLAs 2016–2021
Year of birth missing (living people)